Matt Ouimet is executive chairman of Cedar Fair Entertainment Company, a publicly traded company that owns 12 amusement parks in the United States and Canada.

Early life
Born in 1958 in Cooperstown, New York and raised in Unadilla NY. His first job was working at a grave yard in Unadilla. He graduated from Unatego High School in 1976 and went off to earn a bachelor of science degree in accounting from Binghamton University.

Career highlights
He started work in 1980 at Price Waterhouse and became a certified public accountant. In 1989, he left for Disney.

Ouimet spent 17 years with The Walt Disney Company, including stints  at Walt Disney Imagineering, Disney’s Wide World of Sports, and Vacation Club, president of Disney Cruise Line and president of the Disneyland Resort. Also at Disney Development Co., he served as chief financial officer. He was senior vice president of finance and business development for Walt Disney World until August 1998 when he was transferred to Disney Cruise Line as its senior operating officer. With the August 31, 1999 resignation of Arthur Rodney as cruise line president, Matt Ouimet was named as his replacement in July. In 2003, he was appointed president of Disneyland Resort. There Ouimet prepared for its 50th-anniversary and managed its restoration. He was succeeded as president of the Disneyland Resort by Ed Grier in an announcement made July 25, 2006.

After leaving The Walt Disney Company, Ouimet joined Starwood as president, Hotel Group in 2006. He oversaw global operations for more than 850 hotels in 95 countries. In September 2008, he was replaced by Matthew Avril and departed the company.

In December 2008, Ouimet became the president and chief operating officer of Corinthian Colleges, Inc. He announced on October 11, 2010, that he would be leaving Corinthian for personal reasons.

Matt Ouimet was a director of Collective Brands, Inc., where he served on the audit and finance committee.

In June 2011, Ouimet was named president of Cedar Fair Entertainment Company. He assumed the CEO position on January 3, 2012.

On October 4, 2017, it was announced by Cedar Fair that Ouimet would be stepping down, having Richard A. Zimmerman succeed him. However, it was also announced that Ouimet would take the newly created role of Executive Chairman.

Personal life
As of 2013, Ouimet lives in Avon Lake, Ohio. He is married and has two grown children.

References

Living people
1958 births
American chairpersons of corporations
American chief executives
American chief financial officers
American chief operating officers
Binghamton University alumni
Cedar Fair
Corinthian Colleges
Disney Cruise Line
Disney executives
Disneyland Resort
People from Avon Lake, Ohio
Walt Disney Parks and Resorts people